Call Me Goodie is the debut album by R&B singer Robert "Goodie" Whitfield, released in 1982 on Total Experience Records. It was produced by label owner Lonnie Simmons, famous for his work with the Gap Band, while the song "Come Into My Life" was written and produced by the Gap Band's Ronnie Wilson.

Call Me Goodie peaked at No. 31 on the R&B albums chart. The song "Do Something" was featured on episode #405 of Soul Train.

Track listing
"Do Something" (Lonnie Simmons, Jonah Ellis, Robert "Goodie" Whitfield) 5:57  
"You And I" (Jonah Ellis) 4:35  
"Does Anybody Know Where The Party Is" (Jonas Ellis) 5:55  
"Puddin' Pie" (Jonah Ellis) 4:32  
"L.A." (Robert "Goodie" Whitfield, Lonnie Simmons) 3:47  
"Goodie" (Lonnie Simmons, Robert "Goodie" Whitfield,  Victor "Widetrack" Hill) 5:45 
"Come into My Life" (Ronnie Wilson) 3:56  
"Country Rap" (Lonnie Simmons, Robert "Goodie" Whitfield, Charlie Wilson, Alisa Peoples, Cavin Yarbrough) 4:52  
"Goody Goody" (Marty Malneck, Johnny Mercer) 3:55

References

1982 debut albums
Boogie albums
Funk albums by American artists
Total Experience Records albums
Rhythm and blues albums by American artists
Albums recorded at Total Experience Recording Studios